Silver Spurs is a 1936 American Western film directed by Ray Taylor and written by Joseph F. Poland. Starring Buck Jones, Muriel Evans, George "Gabby" Hayes, J. P. McGowan, Robert Frazer and W. E. Lawrence, it was released on January 29, 1936, by Universal Pictures.

Plot

Cast 
Buck Jones as Jim Fentriss
Muriel Evans as Janet Allison
George "Gabby" Hayes as Drag Harlan 
J. P. McGowan as Webb Allison
Robert Frazer as Art Holden aka Silverspurs
W. E. Lawrence as Henchman Snell
Beth Marion as Peggy Wyman
Earl Askam as Henchman Durango
Bruce Lane as Yuma Kid
Dennis Moore as Dude 
Robert McKenzie as Station Agent

References

External links 
 

1936 films
American Western (genre) films
1936 Western (genre) films
Universal Pictures films
Films directed by Ray Taylor
American black-and-white films
Films with screenplays by Joseph F. Poland
1930s English-language films
1930s American films